The longfin lanternfish (Diogenichthys atlanticus) is a species of oceanodromous lanternfish that is oviparous, and a host of Sarcotretes scopeli.

Distribution and habitat 
It is a widespread species that lives in oceans like the Atlantic, Pacific, and Indian Ocean. It lives from 18 to 1,250 meters below the ocean surface. It can be found at 400 to 930 meters deep during the day, and 18 to 1,050 meters deep at night.

Description 
It grows up to a length of 2.9 cm. It has 11 to 12 dorsal finrays, 16 to 17 anal finrays, and 14 pectoral finrays.

Conservation 
It is an abundant species of fish, with a stable population, with no known threats, and occurs in many marine protected areas, so the IUCN Red List considers it a Least Concern species.

Synonymised names 
Put by the World Register of Marine Species.

 Diogenichthye atlanticus Tåning, 1928 (misspelling)
 Diogenichthys atlanticum (Tåning, 1928)
 Diogenichthys scofieldi Bolin, 1939
 Myctophum laternatum atlanticum Tåning, 1928

References 

Fish described in 1928
Myctophidae
Fish of Australia
Fish of the Pacific Ocean
Fish of the Indian Ocean
Fish of the Atlantic Ocean